Nicolas de Leuchtenberg (Nikolaus Alexander Fritz de Beauharnais, Herzog von Leuchtenberg; born 12 October 1933, Munich) is a claimant to the Dukedom of Leuchtenberg.

Family 
He is the son of Nikolai Nikolaievich de Beauharnais, Duke of Leuchtenberg (in the Russian nobility) (Gori or Novgorod, Russia, 27/29 July (Old Style) 8/10 August (New Style) 1896 - Munich, Bavaria, Germany, 5 May 1937).

Marriage and issue 
On 24 August 1962, he married Anne Christine Bügge (born Stettin, Pomerania, Prussia, Germany, 17 December 1936) in Obernkirchen, Lower Saxony, West Germany], on 24 August 1962 and divorced in 1985, daughter of Gustav Bügge and wife Dorothea Arnold, with whom he had two sons: 
 Nikolaus Maximilian de Beauharnais, Duke of Leuchtenberg (Bonn, North Rhine-Westphalia, West Germany, 20 January 1963 – Sankt Augustin, Bonn, North Rhine-Westphalia, Germany, 8 December 2002), died unmarried and without issue;
 Konstantin Alexander Peter de Beauharnais, Duke of Leuchtenberg (born Bonn, North Rhine-Westphalia, West Germany, 25 June 1965), heir apparent to his father, unmarried and without issue.

Biography 
Born in 1933, Nicolas lives in Sankt Augustin, near Bonn. He has a long career as an audio engineer in German television.

After the death without issue of Sergei Georgievich, 8th Duke of Leuchtenberg, (1890-1974), last holder of the Bavarian title, and that of his eldest son, Nicolas Maximilien (d. 2002), he and his second son Constantin are the last male representatives of the family and of the Russian ducal title.

From 2010s onwards, Nicolas has participated in several commemorations of the installation of his family in the Kingdom of Bavaria in 1814. In 2013, he celebrated his 80th birthday at Eichstätt, the capital of the principality of his ancestors.

References

External links 
web.genealogie.free.fr

Leuchtenberg, Nicolas de
Leuchtenberg, Nicolas de
Leuchtenberg, Nicolas de
Leuchtenberg, Nicolas de